The Raja Ravi Varma Puraskaram (Raja Ravi Varma Award) is an annual award given by the Kerala Lalithakala Akademi, Government of Kerala to a person showing excellence in the field of art and culture. The award is named after Raja Ravi Varma, the Indian Malayali painter and artist. The Kerala state Government instituted this award to honour outstanding Kerala painters and sculptors in 2001. The first recipient was K G Subramanian.

List of winners

References

External links
Official website

Awards established in 2001